Diego Muñoz Camargo (c. 1529 – 1599) was the author of History of Tlaxcala, an illustrated codex that highlights the religious, cultural, and military history of the Tlaxcalan people.

Life
Diego Muñoz Camargo was born in Spanish colonial Mexico of a Spanish father and Indian mother.  He acted as official interpreter for the Spanish, particularly the Franciscans. He was also a chronicler of some note, belonging to a group of mestizo chroniclers with Fernando de Alva Ixtlilxochitl and Fernando Alvarado Tezozomoc. His History of Tlaxcala, one version of a work of various forms stands as an important source for Tlaxcala, in Mexico.

Muñoz Camargo was a businessman who entered into lucrative cross-cultural enterprises. He was able to do this since his father was one of the original Spanish conquistadors of Mexico. He was very active in other realms too. Besides business, he acted as a tutor for the Seminole peoples Alvar Nuñez Cabeza de Vaca brought to Mexico with him, he took urban Tlaxcalan peoples north to Chichimec country ostensibly to ‘civilize’ them, and he took a keen interest in the Spanish chronicles being composed which he inserted into a historical frame with Tlaxcalan tlacuilo manuscripts. This led him to become one of the first Spanish-language chroniclers of Tlaxcala.

Bibliography

Primary Reference
Muñoz Camargo, Diego. Historia de Tlaxcala (Ms. 210 de la Biblioteca Nacional de París).

Secondary Sources

Gibson, Charles. "The Identity of Diego Muñoz Camargo."
Leibsohn, Dana, and Barbara E. Mundy, "Reckoning with Mestizaje," Vistas: Visual Culture in Spanish America, 1520–1820 (2015).
Mignolo, Walter D. "El mandato y la ofrenda: la Descripción de la ciudad y provincia de Tlaxcala, de Diego Muñoz Camargo, y las relaciones de Indias.”
Miller, Marilyn. “Covert Mestizaje and the Strategy of ‘Passing’ in Diego Muñoz Camargo’s Historia de Tlaxcala.”
Mörner, Magnus and Charles Gibson. “Diego Muñoz Camargo and the Segregation Policy of the Spanish Crown.”
Velazco, Salvador. Visiones de Anáhuac: reconstrucciones historiografías y etnicidades emergentes en el México colonial: Fernando de Alva Ixtlilxóchitl, Diego Muñoz Camargo y Hernando Alvarado Tezozómoc.

References

Colonial Mexico
Governors of Tlaxcala
Novohispanic Mesoamericanists
Historians of Mesoamerica
Aztec scholars
Mestizo writers
1520s births
1599 deaths
Tlaxcaltec nobility
16th-century Mesoamericanists
16th-century Mexican historians
Nobility of the Americas